Robert Wilkin may refer to:

Robert Nugen Wilkin (1886–1973), United States federal judge
Robert Wilkin (politician) (1820–1886), New Zealand politician

See also
Robert Wilkins (disambiguation)